Waldhof may refer to:
 Waldhof, Luxembourg, a hamlet in the commune of Niederanven, Luxembourg
 Waldhof, Mannheim, a district of Mannheim, Germany
 Waldhof, the former German name for the Prussian village of Wierzonka, Poland
 a short name for SV Waldhof Mannheim, an association football club located in Mannheim
 Waldhof-Falkenstein, a municipality in the district of Bitburg-Prümin, Rhineland-Palatinate, Germany
 Waldhof (factory), former cellulose factory in Pärnu, Estonia